The Ilirney Range is a range of mountains in Chukotka Autonomous Okrug, Russian Far East. Administratively the range is part of Bilibino District. Bilibino is located to the west of the western end.

Geography
To the southeast of the mountain range rises the Anyuy Range, to the west it borders with the Kyrganay and Chuvanay ranges, to the north with the Rauchuan Range and to the east with the Anadyr Plateau. The Ilirney Range is part of the East Siberian System of mountains and is one of the subranges of the Anadyr Highlands. 

Two beautiful lakes are located below the southern slopes of the range, Lake Ilirney and Lake Tytyl. The Rauchua River flows across the range and the Maly Anyuy River to the south and southwest. The Nomnunkuveem, one of the river branches that form the Chaun River, flows northwards from the northern slopes. Several smaller rivers have their sources in the range, including the Tytylvaam.

Flora and climate
There are sparse forests of larch in river valleys and the mountain slopes are covered with mountain tundra. The climate of the Ilirney Range is subarctic.

See also
Chuvanay Range
Ilirneyite

References

External links
Ilirney Top - Pictures
Ilirney Range and lakes - Images
Ilirney Range pictures
Гора двух цирков
Mountain ranges of Russia
Mountain ranges of Chukotka Autonomous Okrug
Landforms of Siberia